The Combined Logistics Command was a division of the Republic of China Ministry of Defence. It was established in 1946, formerly known as Joint Service Headquarters, then referred to as the Combined Logistics Headquarters, responsible for the ROC military complement, insurance, transport, health and ordnance. The camel symbols used by the Combined Logistics Command were moved to the Ministry of Defense's Armaments Bureau for continued use.

In the past various other departments were under the Combined Logistics Command, including the financial balance (Finance Department Jurisdiction), the printing plant (Measured Department Jurisdiction), plant managements, the national arsenal (Production Department Jurisdiction), the Operations Branch, outpatient centres, and the Cemetery Administration Martyrs Management Group (Business Department Jurisdiction).

In 2002, it was reported that the CLC had exported small arms made in Taiwan to unnamed countries.

List of Commanders
  Army General (June 1, 1946-May 28, 1947)
  Army General (June 28, 1947-August 16, 1949)
  Army General (-April 1, 1950)
  Army General (July 5, 1993-June 30, 1996)
  Army General (March 1, 2002-February 1, 2003)
  Army General (February 1, 2003-May 20, 2004)
  Army General (May 20, 2004-February 16, 2006)
  Marine General (February 16, 2006-January 31, 2007)
  Air Force General (February 1, 2007-October 31, 2008)
  Admiral (November 01, 2008-May 15, 2011)
  Army General (May 16, 2011-December 28, 2012)

References

1946 establishments in China
Military of the Republic of China
Military logistics of Taiwan